Player Character Record Sheets is an accessory designed for the tabletop fantasy role-playing game Dungeons & Dragons.

Publication history

Early years: 1974-1977
The first role-playing game published, Dungeons & Dragons (1974), did not include a character sheet. The first one ever published was in the Haven Herald fanzine of Stephen Tihor in May 1975. One month after, another character sheet was released in the APA magazine Alarums and Excursions.

TSR published its first set of Character Record Sheets for the basic Dungeons & Dragons game in 1977. This set featured a cover by Tom Wham and came as a pack of 28 sheets.

AD&D: 1979-1986
The first Player Character Record Sheets pack for the Advanced Dungeons & Dragons game, designed by Harold Johnson and featuring a cover by Erol Otus, was produced in 1979 as a 32-page booklet. The 1979 version of Player Character Record Sheets for first-edition AD&D features various character record sheets for fighters, clerics, magic users, thieves, and multiclassed characters.

An updated Player Character Record Sheets pack for AD&D (serialized as REF2), with a new cover by Keith Parkinson, was released in 1986 as a 64-page booklet.

REF2 Advanced Dungeons & Dragons Player Character Record Sheets is a booklet containing 16 character sheets, with spaces for recording information for an AD&D character. This includes check-boxes for supplies and ammunition, room for brief details of the character's family and followers, as well as space to record the "Honor" statistic for Oriental Adventures characters. There are also 16 pages of Spell Planner sheets, with lists of every spell available to a particular character class, and three check-boxes to cross off a spell when a character uses it. Each spell has a set of little symbols that provide information regarding the spell, with a key for the symbols found inside the back cover. This version takes into account character information from Unearthed Arcana, Oriental Adventures, and Dungeoneer's Survival Guide.

Basic D&D: 1980-1986
Another version, titled Player Character Record Sheets, was printed for the D&D game in 1980 and consisted of a 32-page booklet of 16 character sheets. The 1980 version of Player Character Record Sheets for Basic D&D contains 16 record sheets to help players keep track of hit points, armor class, characteristics, saving rolls, special abilities, and more. One side is for most of the numerical information; the other for weapons, magical items, etc.

The 10th Anniversary Dungeons & Dragons Collector's Set was a boxed set published by TSR in 1984. It included the rulebooks from the Basic, Expert, and Companion sets; modules AC2, AC3, B1, B2, and M1; Player Character Record Sheets; and dice. This set was limited to 1,000 copies, and was sold by mail and at Gen Con 17.

Player Character Record Sheets (serialized as AC5) was released in 1985 for characters from the Basic, Expert, and Companion boxed sets for the Dungeons & Dragons game. The new rules rendered these character sheets outdated. The AC6 set came out almost immediately after this release, which included character sheets compatible with the rules introduced in Master Rules as well.

AC6 Player Character Record Sheets includes 16 character sheets and 8 spell roster sheets, allowing all the possibilities from the Basic, Expert, Companion, and Master Rules sets.

AD&D 2nd Edition:1989
A simplified and revised 80-page version of REF2 Player Character Record Sheets was printed in 1989 for 2nd edition AD&D.

D&D v3.5: 2004
A set of Deluxe Player Character Record Sheets was published for D&D 3.5 featuring cover art by Wayne Reynolds.

Reception
Elisabeth Barrington reviewed the 1980 Player Character Record Sheets for Basic D&D in The Space Gamer No. 35. She felt that "They are very neatly printed in large type and fairly well organized. There is room for all the numbers and other information necessary, and a box for your character's sketch or symbol." She did note that "However, this is for really simple D&D players: character class is defined as fighter, magic-user, thief, cleric, dwarf, elf, or halfling. The section, 'to-hit roll needed,' does not provide for differing types of weapons - just 10 numbers for the respective amour classes." Barrington concluded her review by saying it was "Recommended for Basic D&D gamers."

Tom Zunder reviewed the REF2 Advanced Dungeons & Dragons Player Character Record Sheets for the British magazine Adventurer #6 (January 1987). He commented that "I really wanted this to be a scenario, the cover art is so nice that it could have been great," and added that "Character sheets are something which not everyone really wants to buy, but these are very nice". He notes that no permission to photocopy is given, meaning a relatively high price "for something that most people could replace with a sheet of A4." He concluded: "That sort of price kind of kills the conversation, doesn't it? Well they are very nice sheets, and in presenting the full breadth of AD&D, they look pretty good. Then again, it costs a lot to have that many rule books, and most people have their own variants... How useful are they? The spell checkers certainly aren't; the print is too small, and their use not exactly proven. I'm afraid I'm going to have to give a thumbs down on this, Sorry guys."

Graeme Davis reviewed the REF2 Advanced Dungeons & Dragons Player Character Record Sheets for White Dwarf #86. Davis wrote that the sheets have "spaces for recording everything you could ever want to record for an AD&D character ... I'm not sure whether there is enough space for things like magic items and weapons, but apart from that everything you'd expect is here." Complimenting the booklet's cover art, Davis said "it's got a very nice cover". He felt that the symbols for each spell were "a nice idea", though he despaired that learning how to use them "could be hard work". He lamented that the brown tone used on the sheets would mean that some parts would come out black when photocopied. Although he felt that 16 character sheets was not a lot for the money, he predicted that "this product will sell well among AD&D players who like using Official character sheets, and not so well among those who don't".

References

External links
 Acaeum

Character sheets
Dungeons & Dragons sourcebooks
Role-playing game supplements introduced in 1979